Gary Armstrong Powell (born 11 November 1969) is an English drummer.

Musical career 
He is primarily known for being the drummer for English bands The Libertines and Dirty Pretty Things, as well as Guyanese-British reggae musician Eddy Grant. Powell joined The Libertines in 2001 after being introduced to frontmen Carl Barât and Pete Doherty by their then-manager Banny Poostchi. He also played with the New York Dolls for their 2004 reunion shows, Powell has performed at the Isle of Wight Festival, Wireless Festival, T in the Park and Oxygen, as well as playing with Red Hot Chili Peppers. 
Powell also has a successful DJ career, deejaying for club NME at London's Koko and Carl Barat's club night as well as many other venues in London. From 2016 to January 2019, Powell was the touring drummer for ska band The Specials, replacing the late John Bradbury. He also runs his own record label, 25 Hour Convenience Store.

Personal life 
Powell has two sons, Wolfe and Asa, with long-term partner Jude.

References

External links
 Albion Arks – Fansite and media archive for everything related to The Libertines
 Short film about Powell at One Eyed Monster
 The Invasion Of... official website

Living people
1969 births
American rock drummers
English rock drummers
The Libertines members
Dirty Pretty Things (band) members
New York Dolls members
People from Los Angeles
People from Birmingham, West Midlands
The Chavs members
The Specials members